Enipeus, in ancient Greece, was a river god. Enipeus was loved by a mortal woman named Tyro, who was married to a mortal man named Cretheus. Poseidon, filled with lust for Tyro, disguised himself as Enipeus and from their union was born Pelias and Neleus, twin boys. The River Enipeus (now Enipeas) is located in Thessaly, and was the site of the Battle of Cynoscephalae and the Battle of Pharsalus.

References

See also
 List of water deities

Potamoi
Personifications of rivers